Kesariya stupa is a Buddhist stupa  in Kesariya, located at a distance of  from Patna, in the Champaran (east) district of Bihar, India. The first construction of the Stupa is dated to the 3rd century BCE.

History
The site's exploration reportedly started in the early 19th century, from its discovery led by Colonel Mackenzie in 1814 to General Cunningham's proper excavation in 1861–62. An excavation was conducted by archaeologist KK Muhammed of the Archaeological Survey of India (ASI) in 1998. The original Kesariya stupa probably dates to the time of Ashoka (circa 250 BCE), as the remains of a capital of a Pillar of Ashoka were discovered there.

The stupa mound may even have been inaugurated during the Buddha's time, as it corresponds in many respects to the description of the stupa erected by the Licchavis of Vaishali to house the alms bowl the Buddha has given them.

The current stupa dates to the Gupta Dynasty between 200 AD and 750 AD, and may have been associated with the 4th century ruler Raja Chakravarti. The local people call this stupa "Devala", meaning "house of god".

The ASI has declared the stupa a protected monument of national importance. Despite being a popular tourist attraction, Kesariya is yet to be developed and a large part of the stupa still remains under vegetation.

Relationship with Borobodur
It has been noted that the Kesariya stupa shares many architectural similarities with the Buddhist temple located in Indonesia, Borobodur which points to a historical connections between east India and South East Asia. Both monuments share a circular mandala form with terraces containing figures of Buddha in the niches. Like Borobodur, Kesariya is also built atop of a hill. The excavated chambers at Kesariya show a combination of statues in bhumisparsha (of Akshobhya) and dhyanimudra (of Amitabha) on the same side, whereas Borobudur houses four Jina Buddhas, displaying their respective mudras on the four sides of the monument.

Gallery

See also

Dhamek Stupa
Chaukhandi Stupa
Sarnath
List of Buddhist temples

References

Archaeological sites in Bihar
Buddhist pilgrimage sites in India
Buddhist sites in Bihar
Stupas in India
Tourism in Bihar